Mansour Mir Ghavami (born 28 September 1926) was an Iranian wrestler. He competed in the men's freestyle light heavyweight at the 1948 Summer Olympics.

References

External links
 

1926 births
Possibly living people
Iranian male sport wrestlers
Olympic wrestlers of Iran
Wrestlers at the 1948 Summer Olympics
Place of birth missing